The 1958 Texas Western Miners football team was an American football team that represented Texas Western College (now known as University of Texas at El Paso) as a member of the Border Conference during the 1958 NCAA University Division football season. In its second season under head coach Ben Collins, the team compiled a 2–7 record (1–4 against Border Conference opponents), finished in a tie for last place in the conference, and was outscored by a total of 179 to 92.

Schedule

References

Texas Western
UTEP Miners football seasons
Texas Western Miners football